Bistrinci is a village in eastern Croatia located north of Belišće. The population is 1,598 (census 2011).

References

Populated places in Osijek-Baranja County